Flu Game is the second studio album by British rapper AJ Tracey. It was released through Revenge Records on 16 April 2021. The album features guest appearances from Nav, Digga D, T-Pain, Kehlani, SahBabii, Millie Go Lightly, MoStack, and Mabel. The production is handled by AJ Tracey himself and executive producer Nyge, alongside The Elements, 5ive Beatz, AOD, Fred Again, Take a Daytrip, Pxcoyo, Yung Swisher, Kazza, Swidom, Yoz Beatz, Ryfy, Mark Raggio, Venna, and JBJ.

Background
The title of the album refers to a 1997 game in the National Basketball Association during its finals in which American player Michael Jordan of the Chicago Bulls got food poisoning, but his team still won against the Utah Jazz. In an interview with NME, AJ Tracey explained what the album is focused on:
 
I feel like that's what [Michael Jordan] was all about. Even with him being ill with food poisoning, he can barely move, but he's dropping points that the other team wishes they could drop. [The album] is about when we go through hard times, but you have to always make sure you put your best foot forward and be great to try to break boundaries. That's what I'm about to release.

Tracey also praised Canadian rapper Nav, who is featured on the second track of the album, "Kukoč", admitting that he has been a long time fan of his music and described him as "dope", further explaining that "the fact that he's of [South] Asian descent... he's carved out that path and no one before him has really set the precedent for someone from his background". He also thought that he can get a little more "vulnerable" on the album and said that listeners would receive "more of an in-depth insight" of his life. Tracey started recording the album near the start of the COVID-19 pandemic, while having to deal with struggles with his family as his mother became ill, followed by his father becoming ill.

Singles and promotion
AJ Tracey released the lead single of the album, "Dinner Guest", featuring fellow British rapper MoStack, on 29 April 2020. The second single, "West Ten", a collaboration with English singer-songwriter Mabel, was released on 2 July 2020. The third single, "Bringing It Back", a collaboration with fellow British rapper Digga D, was released on 4 February 2021. The fourth single, "Anxious", was released on 4 March 2021. "Little More Love" was released as the fifth and final single only one day before the album was released, on 15 April 2021.

On 22 March 2021, AJ Tracey announced the album and its complete details, along with a sketch press conference signing to a fictional basketball team called Revenge Athletic. He released sports-themed merchandise with hoodies, t-shirts and jerseys as promotion for Revenge Records and the album.

Commercial performance
Flu Game debuted at number two on the UK Albums Chart and debuted atop the UK Independent Singles and Albums Chart and UK R&B Singles and Albums Chart, all charts by the Official Charts Company of AJ Tracey's home country of the United Kingdom.

Critical reception

At Metacritic, which assigns a normalized rating out of 100 to reviews from mainstream publications, the album received an average score of 84, indicating "universal acclaim". 

Kate Solomon of INews opined the album as "fiery" and claimed that it was "laden with basketball references" and figuratively described Tracey's goal and intentions for the album, stating that he would "overcome any obstacle, even sometimes a deadly virus, to succeed". Writing for NME, Dhruva Balram felt that Flu Game strengthens AJ Tracey's experimentation with different genres of music, calling him "one of an artist soaring above the rest of the country".

The reviews mainly focused on Tracey's versatility on the album, such as using alternative R&B on some songs.

Track listing

Charts

Certifications

References

External links
 
 

2021 albums
AJ Tracey albums
Albums produced by AJ Tracey
Albums produced by Fred Again
Albums produced by Take a Daytrip